The women's 4×400 metres relay at the 2004 Summer Olympics as part of the athletics program was held at the Athens Olympic Stadium from August 27 to 28. The sixteen teams competed in a two-heat qualifying round in which the first three teams from each heat, together with the next two fastest teams, were given a place in the final race.

Russian Olesya Krasnomovets was out hard down the backstretch, passing Britain's Donna Fraser on her outside and opening up a lead over American DeeDee Trotter chasing to the inside.  But Trotter did not let Krasnomovets go, gaining steadily through the second turn and speeding down the final straightaway to draw even by the handoff to Monique Henderson, giving the U.S. the lead.  Novlene Williams put Jamaica in strong contention a couple of metres behind the Russians.  Through her leg, Henderson expanded the American gap to six metres.  Natalya Nazarova also opened up a little more space on Jamaica.

During the second handoff while in sixth place, Greece's Dimitra Dova was given an inadvertent flat tire by teammate Hrisoula Goudenoudi.  Dova tried to fix her shoe, then stepped into the infield in frustration before returning to the track.  Greece would eventually finish 17 seconds behind the next to last finisher.

Through the third leg, Sanya Richards held a steady three metre lead over Olesya Zykina, while Nadia Davy slightly gained on Zykina from behind.  Coming onto the final straight, Richards exploded, pulling away as Davy pulled to the outside to put her move on Zykina.  They ran even for half the straightaway before Zykina was able to regain command.  Monique Hennagan left with a clear lead for America, the Russians exchanged cleanly with Natalya Antyukh in hot pursuit. But as the Jamaicans exchanged, Sandie Richards ran into the back of Zykina.  As Richards stopped and sidestepped, she lost several metres and the chance at silver.  Hennigan opened up to about 12 meters halfway through the lap, slowing the second half to cross the finish line with just less than a ten-meter advantage in the gold-medal time of 3:19.01.

In 2010, Crystal Cox, who only ran for the U.S. team in the prelims, admitted to using anabolic steroids from 2001 to 2004. As a result, she forfeited all of her results from that time period, and agreed to a four-year suspension, until January 2014. In 2013, both the IAAF and the IOC announced that the result would stand and the American squad (except Cox) would be allowed to retain their gold medals due to the fact that, according to the rules of the time, a team should not be disqualified because of a doping offense of an athlete who didn’t compete in the finals.  Russia's Tatyana Firova from the preliminary round in 2004, became one of two Russian athletes to cause disqualification in 2008.  Russia has not been disqualified in 2004 but was disqualified in 2012 for numerous doping violations.  And the entire Russian athletics team was banned from the 2016 games for its state-sponsored doping.

Records
, the existing World and Olympic records were as follows.

No new records were set during the competition.

Qualification
The qualification period for athletics was 1 January 2003 to 9 August 2004. A National Olympic Committee (NOC) could enter one qualified relay team per relay event, with a maximum of six athletes. For this event, an NOC would be invited to participate with a relay team if the average of the team's two best times, obtained in IAAF-sanctioned meetings or tournaments, would be among the best sixteen, at the end of this period.

Schedule
All times are Greece Standard Time (UTC+2)

Results

Round 1
Qualification rule: The first three teams in each heat (Q) plus the next two fastest overall (q) moved on to the final.

Heat 1

Heat 2

Final

References

External links
 IAAF Athens 2004 Olympic Coverage

W
Relay foot races at the Olympics
2004 in women's athletics
Women's events at the 2004 Summer Olympics